Kabi or KABI may refer to:

Places
Kabi Longstok, town in North Sikkim district, Sikkim, India
Kabi, Sikkim, village in North Sikkim district, Sikkim, India
Kabi River (Kafu River), river in Uganda

People
Boris Kabi (born 1984), Ivorian footballer
Martinho Ndafa Kabi (born 1957), Bissau-Guinean politician
Neeraj Kabi, Indian actor
Yahya Kabi (born 1987), Saudi Arabian footballer
Käbi Laretei (1922–2014), Swedish pianist

Other
 Gubbi Gubbi people or Kabi Kabi people, an Aboriginal Australian people in Queensland
 KABI (AM), AM radio station in Abilene, Kansas
 KABI-LD, a low-power television station (channel 32, virtual 42) licensed to serve Snyder, Texas, United States
 KSAJ-FM, a radio station (98.5 FM) licensed to serve Burlingame, Kansas, United States, which held the call sign KABI-FM from 1968 to 1985
 The ICAO airport code for Abilene Regional Airport in Abilene, Texas